Fiona Elliot is a female former international table tennis player from England.

Table tennis career
She represented England at four successive World Table Tennis Championships, from 1987 until 1993, in the Corbillon Cup (women's team event).

She won 15 English National Table Tennis Championships including two singles titles in 1987 and 1990.

Personal life
She married French international Didier Mommessin and then competed as Fiona Mommessin.

See also
 List of England players at the World Team Table Tennis Championships

References

English female table tennis players
Living people
Year of birth missing (living people)